Cheilanthes caudata is a species of fern in the family Pteridaceae, native to northern Australia and possibly New Caledonia.

References

Pteridaceae
Taxa named by Robert Brown (botanist, born 1773)